Félix-Gabriel Marchand (January 9, 1832 – September 25, 1900) was a journalist, author, notary and politician in Quebec, Canada. He was the 11th premier of Quebec from May 24, 1897, to September 25, 1900.

Born in what is Saint-Jean-sur-Richelieu, Quebec today, he was the son of Lt.-Colonel Gabriel Marchand (1780–1852) J.P., and Mary MacNider, a woman of the Anglican faith, daughter of John MacNider, 2nd Seigneur of Metis, Quebec. As a child, Marchand attended English schools and was taught in French at the age of 11. Fluently bilingual, Marchand became a journalist and writer. He became a notary and practised this profession for 45 years, but continued journalism and writing as well.

He was elected to the Legislative Assembly of Quebec in the 1867 Quebec provincial election for the district of Saint-Jean and retained his seat for 33 years until his death.  He was Leader of the Opposition from 1892 to 1897, and then won the 1897 election as leader of the Liberal Party.

As premier, Marchand attempted to create a Ministry of Education in 1898. At the time, education was entirely in the hands of the clergy of the Roman Catholic Church in the province.  His legislation was passed by the Legislative Assembly (the lower chamber of Quebec's legislature), but was defeated in the Legislative Council (the upper house).  It was not until 1964 that a Ministry of Education was finally created in Quebec.

Félix-Gabriel Marchand was still in office when he died in 1900 in Quebec City. He is interred in the cimetière Notre-Dame-de-Belmont in Sainte-Foy, Quebec.

Dr. André Simard, husband of Marthe Simard, was his grandson.

See also
 Politics of Quebec
 Quebec general elections
 Timeline of Quebec history

References

External links
 Biography at the Dictionary of Canadian Biography Online
 

1832 births
1900 deaths
Anglophone Quebec people
Canadian people of French descent
Canadian people of Scottish descent
Premiers of Quebec
Presidents of the National Assembly of Quebec
Quebec Liberal Party MNAs
Quebec political party leaders
Quebecers of French descent